Heitstrenging is an Old Norse term referring to the swearing of a solemn oath to perform a future action. They were often performed at Yule and other large social events, where they played a role in establishing and maintaining good relationships principally between members of the aristocratic warrior elite. The oath-swearing practice varied significantly, sometimes involving ritualised drinking or placing hands on a holy pig (referred to as a sónargöltr) that could later be sacrificed. While originally containing heathen religious components such as prayers and worship of gods such as Freyr and Thor, the practice continued in an altered manner after the Christianisation of Scandinavia. 

Etymology

Attestations

Helgakviða Hjörvarðssonar
Heitstrenging at Yule-evening is described in the prose of Helgakviða Hjörvarðssonar, involving placing one's hands on the bristles of the sónargöltr and drinking of the bragarfull:

Hervarar saga ok Heiðreks
Hervarar saga ok Heiðreks describes  taking place in a similar manner to in Helgakviða Hjǫrvarðssonar. The principal manuscripts for the saga vary considerably with the account in manuscript H as follows:

Here, the ritual is dedicated to only Freyr, while in the U manuscript it is also to Freyja though this is typically amended to Freyr. The U manuscript furthermore describes the ritual and the involvement of the boar to be a custom at the time of the saga narrative and tells how there was an effort to breed the largest pig possible for the occasion.

Succession of Sweyn Forkbeard

Fagrskinna
In Fagrskinna, the term  is used to describe the swearing of an oath on a bragarfull at Harald Bluetooth's memorial feast:

Later in the account, Sweyn Forkbeard swears on the bragafull to conquer England or die in the attempt,  before claiming his inheritance, and Earl Sigvaldi does the same for Norway.

Óláfs saga Tryggvasonar and Jómsvíkinga saga
In Óláfs saga Tryggvasonar and Jómsvíkinga saga, accounts are given of the same memorial feast as in Fagrskinna. As in the other description, Sweyn's  and toasting is required before the formal transfer of power can occur, however here, toasts are given to Jesus and Archangel Michael instead of to ancestors or a heathen god.

In Jómsvíkinga saga, after Earl Sigvaldi's vow, some of the men including his brother take turns to make greater vows, including not fleeing in battle, killing Thorkill Leira and raping his daughter.

Other accounts
 are well attested in Old Norse sagas where they can play key roles in tales, such as Earl Herrauðr swearing to give his daughter Þóra in marriage to whoever kills the worm which has trapped her in Ragnars saga loðbrókar and Hrafnkell swearing to kill any who ride Freyfaxi, a horse dedicated to Freyr, in Hrafnkels saga Freysgoða. In the latter case, Hrafnkell reflects on his vow, saying "[o]ften we shall repent when we speak too much but seldom we would rue it if we had spoken less". In other attestations the oath is more symbolic, such as when Harald Fairhair promised to not comb or cut his hair until he ruled all of Norway.

In Harðar saga, Hróarr steps on a log at Yule before making a vow to break into the grave mound of the viking Sóti, followed by Hǫrðr vowing to accompany him and a third vowing to follow Hǫrðr, forming a formula also seen in Hrólfs saga kraka. Hænsa-Þóris saga presents an alternative way of performing  in which Hersteinn steps onto a stone with one foot before swearing an oath.

Interpretation and discussion
 took place at Yule and other sacrificial feasts, weddings, arvals, and banquets and often acted as a form of bragging and promising the performance of an often great feat. Their role has been argued to have been particularly royal remembrance feasts where, along with group toasting, it was performed by the new king who would swear to protect and strengthen the kingdom. The process involved making prayers to either Christian or heathen gods and honouring the previous ruler and has been proposed to have had a central role in both reassuring the king's followers and legitimising his power. Due to the ritual process,  usually came after the speaker was drunk. 

Though it had been argued historically that the custom of  died out upon the Christianisation of the North Germanic peoples, it is now accepted to have continued by that name at least into the second half of the 13th century based on Sturlunga saga which provides a contemporary account of the practice and is dated to that time period. It further records the practice at a battle which took place on Easter 1244 in which a chieftain vowed to never capture a man in a church.  further became a recurring motif in later sagas.

Strong similarities have been noted between heitstrenging and Anglo-Saxon oath swearing practices, referred to by Old English terms such as beots, in which vows to affirm bonds among rulers and retainers often took place at feasts accompanied by drink and the giving of gifts such as rings. It has been further suggested that the tradition could have spread to the North Germanic peoples through contact with the Anglo-Saxons due to some of the earliest attestations of  formulae are found in Old English sources such as Beowulf and the Battle of Maldon. Similar practices have also been observed dating to the High Medieval Period in France and among the slavic peoples, although scholars have not reached a consensus over, whether and to what extent, they are influenced by the Germanic traditions.

It has been noted that this combination is also seen in an English context in the Breca episode of Beowulf.

Notes

See also 
 Animal worship
 Rings in Germanic cultures – objects used for oath swearing in Germanic cultures

References

Bibliography

Primary

Secondary
 
 
 
 
 
 
 
 
 
 
 
 
 

Norse paganism
Religious oaths
Yule